Mexicana Universal 2019 was the second edition of the Mexicana Universal beauty pageant, formerly called Nuestra Belleza Mexico until 2017. Andrea Toscano of Colima crowned her successor Sofía Aragón of Jalisco at the end of the event. Later, in November 2020, Claudia Lozano of Nuevo León, replaced her as 1st Runner Up and take her place.

Results

Contestants
The following are the list of official candidates of Mexicana Universal 2019:

Notes

Withdrawals
 Campeche
 Coahuila
 Quintana Roo
 Tlaxcala

Dethroned
  Jalisco Dorothy Sutherland was dismissed as Mexicana Universal Jalisco for breach of contract and not showing up at the national contest rally in Mexico City.

References

External links
Official Website
El Universal Mexicana Universal Website

2019 beauty pageants
Beauty pageants in Mexico
Mexicana Universal
2019 in Mexico